Bert F. LaBrucherie (January 19, 1905 – December 10, 1986) was an American football player and coach.  He served as the head football coach at the University of California, Los Angeles (UCLA) from 1945 to 1948 and at the California Institute of Technology (Caltech) from 1949 to 1967, compiling a career college football record of 42–136–2.  LaBrucherie was inducted into the UCLA Athletic Hall of Fame in 1987.

Playing career
LaBrucherie played varsity football for UCLA from 1926 to 1928.

Football coaching career
After graduating from UCLA in 1929, LaBrucherie coached the football team at Los Angeles High School, his alma mater.  As head coach from 1935 to 1944, he had a 60–10–2 record.  His team won three "B" team league titles and seven "A" team championships.  From 1945 to 1948, he was the head coach for the UCLA Bruins.  He then served as the head coach at Caltech from 1949 to 1967.  His 1946 UCLA Bruins team lost to Illinois in the 1947 Rose Bowl.

LaBrucherie's overall record at UCLA was 23–16.  In his second year as head coach, the Bruins were Pacific Coast Conference champions, and lost to Illinois in the Rose Bowl.  LaBrucherie coached the Caltech Beavers for 19 years in the Southern California Intercollegiate Athletic Conference.  Though the Caltech coaching position was less demanding, Coach LaBrucherie once explained in an interview that sometimes the players would "line up with the wrong team."  Caltech canceled its football program after the 1993 season, and its last football coach was Wendell Jack.

Other sports
Also while at Caltech, LaBrucherie coached track and cross country.  Under his leadership, the track team posted an overall record of 107–105.  After resigning as the head football coach at Caltech, he coached cross country from 1968 until his retirement in 1973.

Head coaching record

College football

References

1905 births
1986 deaths
American football halfbacks
Caltech Beavers football coaches
UCLA Bruins football players
UCLA Bruins football coaches
College cross country coaches in the United States
College track and field coaches in the United States
High school football coaches in California
Coaches of American football from California
Players of American football from Los Angeles
Sports coaches from Los Angeles